John Robert Webber (born August 5, 1965) is an American jazz double-bassist.

Early life and education 
Webber was born in St. Louis. He first learned to play bass guitar before switching to stand-up bass at age 15. He attended Northern Illinois University and Roosevelt University in Chicago, where he worked with Von Freeman and Brad Goode.

Career 
Webber relocated to New York City in 1987 and played with Bill Hardman, Junior Cook, Tardo Hammer, John Marshall, and Michael Weiss before the end of the decade. In the 1990s he played with Christopher Hollyday, Johnny Griffin, Jimmy Cobb, Lou Donaldson, David Hazeltine, Diana Krall, Annie Ross, Mike LeDonne, Peter Bernstein, Eric Alexander, Chris Flory, Doug Lawrence, Etta Jones, Jim Rotondi, Ryan Kisor, and Horace Silver.

Discography

As sideman
With Eric Alexander
Straight Up (Delmark, 1992)
Mode for Mabes (Delmark, 1997)
Summit Meeting (Milestone, 2001)
Dead Center (HighNote, 2004)
Sunday in New York (Venus, 2005)
Chim Chim Cheree (Venus, 2009)
Touching (HighNote, 2012)
Chicago Fire (HighNote, 2013)
The Real Thing (HighNote, 2015)
With Etta Jones
My Buddy: Etta Jones Sings the Songs of Buddy Johnson (HighNote, 1998)
All the Way (HighNote, 1999)
Etta Jones Sings Lady Day (HighNote, 2001)
With Harold Mabern
Mr. Lucky (HighNote, 2012)
Live at Smalls (Smalls Live)
Right On Time (Smoke Sessions)
Afro Blue (Smoke Sessions)
The Iron Man: Live at Smoke (Smoke Sessions, 2018)
Mabern Plays Mabern (Smoke Sessions, 2018)
Mabern Plays Coltrane (Smoke Sessions, 2018)
With Cecil Payne
Payne's Window (Delmark, 1999)

References
Gary W. Kennedy, "John Webber". The New Grove Dictionary of Jazz. 2nd edition, ed. Barry Kernfeld.

Living people
1965 births
American jazz double-bassists
Male double-bassists
Musicians from St. Louis
Jazz musicians from Missouri
21st-century double-bassists
21st-century American male musicians
American male jazz musicians
One for All (band) members

de:John Webber